Backlash is a 1967 album by trumpeter Freddie Hubbard, his first released on the Atlantic label. It features performances by Hubbard, James Spaulding, Albert Dailey, Bob Cunningham, Otis Ray Appleton and Ray Barretto.

Reception
A reviewer on Dusty Groove commented "One of Freddie Hubbard's greatest records – a soaring bit of soulful modernism that's almost a precursor to 70s sounds on record labels like Black Jazz or Strata East! Freddie's at his early best here – stepping aside from some of the more serious Blue Note modes, and definitely feeling himself more strongly – reaching out with this righteous vibe that's quite different than later electric work in the 60s – and which, quite honestly, almost comes through best on this record than anywhere else! The group are wonderful too – and James Spaulding turns in some killer flute and alto work for the date – perfect for Freddie's lines on trumpet." Scott Yanow of AllMusic stated "The first of trumpeter Freddie Hubbard's three Atlantic albums, this excellent set falls between hard bop and the avant-garde, often hinting at both... Hubbard and Spaulding made for an excellent team and there are plenty of exciting moments on this brief but potent set.

Track listing
All compositions by Freddie Hubbard except as indicated
 "Backlash" (Donald Pickett) - 4:15
 "The Return of the Prodigal Son" (Harold Ousley) - 5:42
 "Little Sunflower" - 7:55
 "On the Que-Tee" - 5:47
 "Up Jumped Spring" - 6:43
 "Echoes of Blue" (Cunningham) - 9:44

Personnel
Freddie Hubbard - trumpet, flugelhorn
James Spaulding - flute, alto saxophone
Albert Dailey - piano
Bob Cunningham - bass
Otis Ray Appleton - drums
Ray Barretto - percussion (tracks 1,2,3)

References

1967 albums
Freddie Hubbard albums
Albums produced by Arif Mardin
Atlantic Records albums